Asteras Petriti F.C. is a Greek football club, based in Petriti, Corfu.

Honors

Domestic Titles and honors
 Eps Kerkyra Champions: 2
 2015-16, 2021-22

Football clubs in the Ionian Islands (region)
Association football clubs established in 1981
1981 establishments in Greece
Gamma Ethniki clubs